Jean Louis Vergez (July 9, 1906 – July 15, 1991) was an American professional baseball player. A third baseman, his career lasted for 18 seasons (1926–43) and included all or parts of six years (1931–36) in Major League Baseball and extensive service in  the Pacific Coast League. Born in Oakland, California, to French immigrants, he graduated from nearby Alameda High School and attended Saint Mary's College of California.

Vergez achieved early success in 1929–30 with his hometown team, the Oakland Oaks, hitting over .300 each season, and smashing 46 and 29 home runs. He was the PCL's All-Star third baseman in 1929. Starting in 152 games as a rookie, Vergez reached career highs in hits, batting average (.278) and runs batted in (81). 

But  was a year marred by personal tragedy. Just prior to the start of the regular season, his infant son, John Louis, was stricken with poliomyelitis and died. Although Vergez was able to play in 118 games, his production declined considerably. His manager, Bill Terry, assured the grieving Vergez a place on his  roster. That season, Vergez rebounded to hit a career-high 16 home runs in 123 games. But, suffering from appendicitis, he could not play during the September stretch drive nor in the 1933 World Series, won by the Giants in five games with Travis Jackson at the hot corner. The following season, saw a sharp fall-off in Vergez' play. He batted only .200 in 320 at bats in what would be his final campaign as a New York Giant. 

On November 1, 1934, he was traded to the second-division Philadelphia Phillies with Pretzel Pezzullo, Blondy Ryan and George Watkins for shortstop Dick Bartell. He played in 148 games for the 1935 Phillies and led National League third basemen in double plays. The Cardinals gave him a nine-game trial, then sent him to the minor-league Sacramento Solons. 

His MLB career at an end, Vergez played for almost eight full seasons in the Pacific Coast League with Sacramento (1936–38) and then, from 1939–43, as the player-manager of the Oakland Oaks. He later scouted for the Giants and was the head baseball coach at Saint Mary's College, where he tutored future MLB third baseman Andy Carey. He died in 1991 at age 85 in Oroville, California.

References

External links 

1906 births
1991 deaths
American people of French descent
Baseball coaches from California
Baseball players from Oakland, California
Major League Baseball third basemen
New York Giants (NL) players
New York Giants (NL) scouts
Oakland Oaks (baseball) managers
Oakland Oaks (baseball) players
Ogden Gunners players
Philadelphia Phillies players
Sacramento Solons players
St. Louis Cardinals players
Saint Mary's Gaels baseball coaches
San Antonio Bears players
Terrell Terrors players